Black is the eighth studio album by American country music artist Dierks Bentley. It was released on May 27, 2016, by Capitol Nashville. Bentley explained that this is a record about relationships, and follows the same person throughout the track listing going through them. The lead single, "Somewhere on a Beach", was released to radio on January 18, 2016. The album's second single, "Different for Girls" (featuring Elle King), was released to country radio on June 6, 2016. The album's title track was released to country radio as the third single on November 14, 2016. "What the Hell Did I Say" was sent to country radio as the albums fourth and final single June 26, 2017.

Black garnered positive reviews from critics, praising the blend of classic and modern country aesthetics and its exploration of mature themes. It debuted at number two on the Billboard 200, selling 101,000 equivalent album units and 88,000 copies in the first week. It was certified Gold by the Recording Industry Association of America (RIAA) for combined sales, streaming and track-sales equivalent of half-a-million units.

Summary
Bentley announced the album along with its first single "Somewhere on a Beach" on January 18, 2016, via his social media sites. The second single, "Different for Girls" featuring Elle King, was released on June 6, 2016. The third single, also the title track, was released on November 14, 2016. The fourth single, "What the Hell Did I Say", was  released on June 26, 2017.

Bentley also released a series of promo videos for "I'll Be the Moon", "What the Hell Did I Say", "Pick Up" and "Black".

In a statement about the album, Bentley said that although it bears the maiden name of his wife Cassidy, it tells a universal tale of hookups, breakups, and everything in between, shining a light on the things that occur after the sun goes down. He also noted that "It's a relationship album that covers the ups and downs of the journey and ends with some self-realization and evolvement. The song 'Black' helps set all of that in motion at the top of the album by guiding you into the darkness and the shadows of the night. The same guy who sings 'Somewhere On a Beach' winds up growing and having enough perspective to sing something introspective like 'Different for Girls'. By the last song, he's taking a look back on love and life."

Critical reception

Indicating in a review by Rolling Stone, Stephen L. Betts says, "But what lifts Black past merely being a good concept album is an old-school musicality that never takes a backseat to modern-country conventionality." Stephen Thomas Erlewine, doing the review for AllMusic, describes, "It's mood music, sometimes playing as smooth as a seduction but better suited for moments of introspection when you're surrounded by a crowd and need to isolate." Reviewing the album from Newsday, Glenn Gamboa writes, "expertly weaving styles and storytelling tricks to build memorable tales to sing along with." Chuck Yarborough, giving a review of the album at The Plain Dealer, states, "It is a grownup album, with grownup themes, grownup lyrics and grownup performances, especially from Bentley with his pen and on the microphone." In 2017, Billboard contributor Chuck Dauphin placed two tracks from the album on his top 10 list of Bentley's best songs: the title track at number three and "Different for Girls" at number six.

Commercial performance
The album debuted at number 2 on the Billboard 200 with 101,000 equivalent album units; it sold 88,000 copies in its first week. It was the best-selling album of the week. Black became Bentley's highest-charting album on the Billboard 200 and largest sales week. The album was certified Gold by the RIAA on February 22, 2017. The album has sold 276,400 copies in the US as of November 2017.

Track listing

Personnel

 Roy Agee – trombone
 Jessi Alexander – background vocals
 Sam Ashworth – background vocals
 Dierks Bentley – lead vocals
 Jeff Coffin – saxophone
 Ross Copperman – bass guitar, acoustic guitar, electric guitar, keyboards, programming, background vocals
 Luke Dick – acoustic guitar, electric guitar, programming, background vocals
 Jerry Douglas – dobro
 Dan Dugmore – electric guitar, pedal steel guitar
 Fred Eltringham – drums
 Mike Haynes – trumpet
 Natalie Hemby – background vocals
 Lee Hendricks – bass guitar
 Jedd Hughes – acoustic guitar, electric guitar
 Jaren Johnston – acoustic guitar, electric guitar, background vocals
 Elle King – duet vocals on "Different for Girls"
 Luke Laird – acoustic guitar, electric guitar, programming, background vocals
 Hillary Lindsey – background vocals
 Tony Lucido – bass guitar
 Maren Morris – harmony vocals on "I'll Be the Moon"
 Russ Pahl – pedal steel guitar
 Danny Rader – bouzouki, acoustic guitar, electric guitar, keyboards, programming, synthesizer
 Jimmy Robbins – programming
 Aaron Sterling – drums, percussion
 Bryan Sutton – acoustic guitar
 Trombone Shorty – trombone on "Mardi Gras"
 Micah Wilshire – background vocals
 Charlie Worsham – acoustic guitar, electric guitar
 Craig Wright – drums
 Jonathan Yudkin – string arrangements, strings

Charts

Weekly charts

Year-end charts

Singles

Certifications

Release history

Notes

References

2016 albums 
Albums produced by Ross Copperman
Capitol Records Nashville albums
Dierks Bentley albums